Tommy Robredo and Marcel Granollers were the defending champions. Robredo chose to compete in the 2010 ABN AMRO World Tennis Tournament instead. Granollers partnered with Pablo Cuevas, and they won in the final 7–5, 6–4 against Łukasz Kubot and Oliver Marach.

Seeds

Draw

Draw

External links
Main Draw Doubles

Doubles